Matty Gee (born 12 December 1994) is an English professional rugby league footballer who plays as a  forward for the Halifax Panthers in the RFL Championship.

He has played for the Salford Red Devils in the Super League, and on loan from Salford at the North Wales Crusaders in League 1, and the Hunslet Hawks and  Workington Town in the Championship. Gee has played for the London Broncos in the Championship and the Super League, and on loan from the Broncos at the London Skolars in League 1. He has also played for Hull Kingston Rovers in the top flight.

Background
Gee was born in Wigan, Greater Manchester, England.

Playing career

Salford Red Devils
Gee played for the Red Devils in the Super League.

In 2014 he was loaned to North Wales in League 1.

In 2015 he was loaned to Hunslet in the Championship.

In 2016 he was loaned to the Crusaders in League 1. Later in 2016 he was loaned to Workington in the Championship.

London Broncos
Gee played for the London Broncos in the Championship and the top flight, and spent time on loan from the Broncos at the London Skolars in League 1.

Hull Kingston Rovers
After London's final-day points difference relegation from the Super League, Gee left the capital and moved to Hull KR ahead of the 2020 Super League season.

Leigh Centurions
On 6 October 2020 it was announced that Gee would join the Leigh Centurions for the 2021 season.

Halifax Panthers
On 1 Nov 2021 it was reported that he had signed for Halifax Panthers in the RFL Championship

References

External links
London Broncos profile
SL profile
Salford Red Devils profile

1994 births
Living people
Dewsbury Rams players
English rugby league players
Halifax R.L.F.C. players
Hull Kingston Rovers players
Hunslet R.L.F.C. players
Leigh Leopards players
London Broncos players
London Skolars players
North Wales Crusaders players
Rugby league locks
Rugby league players from Wigan
Rugby league second-rows
Salford Red Devils players
Workington Town players